Deir al-Asad is an Arab town in the Galilee region of Israel, near Karmiel. Together with the adjacent town of Bi'ina it formed the site of the Crusader monastery town of St. George de la Beyne, an administrative center of the eponymous fief which spanned part of the central Galilee. Control of the fief changed several times from the noble Milly family to Joscelyn III of Courtenay and ultimately to the Teutonic Order before the area passed to Mamluk rule in the late 13th century. Settlement continued under the Mamluks and the village's St. George monastery was mentioned as treating the mentally ill in the late 14th century. The modern Muslim town of Deir al-Asad, previously known as Deir al-Bi'ina or Deir al-Khidr, was established in 1516 when the Ottoman sultan Selim I granted its monastery as a waqf (religious endowment) to the Sufi sage Shaykh Muhammad al-Asad, who settled in it with his family and devotees. The village's original Christian population was expelled by the same order and relocated to Bi'ina, while a Druze community which established itself in the town emigrated to the Hauran by the late 1870s.

The village was captured by Israel in the 1948 Arab-Israeli War, immediately after which it was temporarily emptied of its inhabitants and looted by Israeli troops before its residents were allowed to return, although a number of inhabitants became Palestinian refugees in the Ain al-Hilweh camp in Lebanon. A significant part of its agricultural lands were confiscated by the authorities in 1962 and formed part of the new Jewish city of Karmiel. Most of Deir al-Asad's residents belong to the clans of Asadi, descendants of Shaykh Muhammad al-Asad, and Dabbah, established in the village in the 18th century. In 2003 Deir al-Asad was merged with Bi'ina and nearby Majd al-Krum to form the single municipality of Shaghur, the name of the Ottoman district in which the towns had once been part, but the municipal union was dissolved in 2008.

Etymology
Deir al-Asad means "the lion's monastery" in Arabic.

History

Crusader and Mamluk period
In the Crusader period, the immediate region operated as a fiefdom, known as St. George de la Beyne. Deir al-Asad and Bi'ina were the actual village of St. George de la Beyne and Deir al-Asad likely served as the administrative center of the fief, which included Sajur and Buqei'a. According to the historian Joshua Prawer, the Crusader name "la Beyne" was from the Arabic name of the village "al-Bi'ina" and St. George was likely a corruption of the Arabic word sajara, which means "grove". It was exchanged by a certain Philip, head of the Milly family from Champagne, for lands in Transjordan and the hills around Hebron. The king of Jerusalem became the fief's seigneur and the services of Henricus de Milly, a wealthy relative of Philip, were transferred to the king as well. Henricus and his household continued to reside in St. George de la Beyne. A Crusader building still exists in the center of Deir al-Asad and Bi'ina which was identified as a Carthusian abbey. St. George de la Beyne was bequeathed to Henricus's daughter Helvis.

By 1182, St. George de la Beyne came under the control of Joscelyn III of Courtenay. In 1187 the area was captured by Muslim forces under Saladin before passing again to Crusader control. While it was still under Muslim rule, the fief was transferred to the Pisans of Conrad de Montferrat. At a later point it was transferred to a descendant of Henricus and Josceleyn III. Between 1220 and 1249 the fief came under the full control of the Teutonic Order.

The combined site of Deir al-Asad and Bi'ina remained inhabited under the Mamluks. The historian al-Qalqashandi (d. 1418) noted it was a village of the Sajur district and contained a monastery. A Mamluk source active as the Islamic head judge of Safad in the 1370s, Shams al-Din al-Uthmani, noted that the monastery treated the mentally ill.

Ottoman period

Endowment to Muhammad al-Asad
According to Ottoman waqf (religious endowment) documents from 1838 and likely as early as the 16th century, historical accounts, and local folklore, Deir al-Asad was granted to the 16th-century Sufi sage Shaykh Muhammad al-Asad, who was also known as Ibn Abd Allah al-Asadi, and bore the alternative epithets al-Safadi (of Safed) or al-Biqa'i (of the Beqaa Valley). The waqf documents maintain that Sultan Selim I was the grantor. On the other hand, the Damascene historian al-Burini (d. 1615), who was in turn copied by the historian Muhammad al-Muhibbi (d. 1699), and the village tradition hold that Sultan Suleiman was the grantor. The modern historian Aharon Layish considers the former version to be correct. Selim, a sultan with strong Sufi sympathies who particularly favored Ibn Arabi, to whose Sufi school Shaykh al-Asad belonged, granted the village, then known as Deir al-Bi'ina or Deir al-Khidr (deir is Arabic for monastery and al-Khidr is a name used in Arabic to refer to St. George) soon after his conquest of the coastal cities of Syria from the Mamluks in 1516.

Shaykh al-Asad was originally from the village of Hammara in the Beqaa Valley, moved to Damascus where he became a student of the Sufi sage Ibn Arraq, a follower of Ibn Arabi's school of thought, before settling in Deir al-Bi'ina by at least 1510, before the Ottoman conquest. Although local folklore attributes the name Asad (Arabic for lion) to his taming of a lion, Layish surmises that the name was already established; by his summation, Shaykh al-Asad was possibly a kinsman of Asad al-Sham Abd Allah al-Yunini (d. 1220) from Younin in the Beqaa Valley, who was a Sufi mystic and warrior in the army of Saladin in the wars against the Crusaders, or a descendant of Saladin through the latter's son al-Aziz Uthman. Selim spent two months in Damascus and likely became acquainted with Shaykh al-Asad through Ibn Arraq. Al-Burini's account holds that Shaykh al-Asad was granted the village to settle in with his children and Sufi devotees and that its original Christian inhabitants were expelled by the sultan's order; Layish theorizes that the sultan intended for the village to become a Muslim nucleus in order to strengthen Islamic control of the "security sensitive" area whose proximity to the coast left it vulnerable to European Christian penetration. Shaykh al-Asad was concurrently appointed the imam of the mosque established in the monastery of St. George and as the administrator of the waqf property. His son Ahmad (d. 1601) later founded a Sufi lodge in Safed, although according to a family tree preserved by Shaykh al-Asad's descendants, he did not have a son by this name, but rather an agnate grandson, Ahmad ibn Mahfuz. His other sons continued to reside in Deir al-Bi'ina, which became known as Deir al-Asad by dint of its association with Shaykh al-Asad.

Shaykh al-Asad died in 1569. The descendants of his four sons are known as the Asadi clan and their original area of residence forms the core of Deir al-Asad. Other Muslim clans in the village moved there to find refuge and were given the protection of the Asadi clan. The attraction to Deir al-Asad during the early Ottoman era may have stemmed from its inhabitants' exemption from army service and the village's reputation as a refuge, including for criminals evading government pursuit. According to local tradition, two brothers whose descendants formed Deir al-Asad's Dabbah clan settled in the village's upper neighborhood in the 18th century.

Nineteenth century
Deir al-Asad possessed a large fortified monastery called St. George. The site's earlier Christian inhabitants relocated to Bi'ina, where they built a new monastery, giving to it the same name as the former. In 1838, Deir al-Asad was noted as a village in the Shaghur district, which was located between Safad, Acca and Tiberias. Deir al-Asad and nearby Bi'ina were both inhabited by members of the Druze community when Victor Guérin visited in the 1875, but by the late 1870s, they had emigrated to the Hauran to avoid conscription by the Ottoman army. In the PEF's Survey of Western Palestine (SWP) in 1881, Deir al-Asad was described as a village of 600 Muslims, containing a few ruins of the original Christian settlement. It was surrounded by olive trees and arable land, with a spring nearby. A population list from about 1887 showed that Deir al-Asad had about 725 inhabitants, all Muslims.

British Mandate period
In the 1922 census of Palestine, conducted by the British Mandate authorities, Deir al-Asad had a population of 749, all Muslim, increasing in the 1931 census to 858, still all Muslims, living in total of 179 houses. By the 1945 statistics, Deir al-Asad had 1,100 inhabitants, all Muslims. They owned a total of 8,366 dunams of land, while 7 dunams were public. 1,322 dunams were plantations and irrigable land, 1,340 used for cereals, while 38 dunams were built-up (urban) land.

Israel
Units from the Arab Liberation Army evacuated Deir al-Asad and Bi'ina on 29 October 1948. Village notables officially surrendered to Israeli forces the next day and Israel's Golani Brigade entered on 31 October. The inhabitants of both villages were assembled in the central square of Bi'ina where Israeli troops picked four men at random, two from each village, and had them executed in a nearby olive grove. A further 270 men were transferred to a prisoners-of-war camp while the remainder of the inhabitants were temporarily ousted to the environs of nearby Rameh. Israeli troops looted the villages then allowed the inhabitants to return after a few days. On 5 November Israeli troops blew up three houses in Deir al-Asad. On 6 January 1949, 62 people from villages depopulated during the war were rounded up and expelled by the Israeli authorities. A number of Deir al-Asad's inhabitants became refugees in Lebanon and some 2,500 members of the village's Asadi clan resided in the Ain al-Hilweh camp in 1982.

Before 1962 Deir al-Asad was self-sufficient in food. The village produced enough meat, fruit, wheat and vegetables for its inhabitants and sold the surplus in Acre or Nazareth. In 1962 its land in the Majd al-Kurum valley was expropriated for the Karmiel town project, stripping the village of its most fertile acres and irreparably harming the local economy in the process. Only the hill land to the north, consisting mainly of olive groves, remained. Today only 10% of the labour force can work on the land, over 80% commute daily to the factories of Haifa or work as labourers on Jewish farms.

The two main clans of Deir al-Asad are Asadi and Dabbah. In 1957 the Asadi clan numbered some 800 persons and by 1984, they were about 2,400, accounting for roughly half of the population. In 2000 the two clans each numbered about 3,000 members in the town. Members of the Asadi clan continued to administer and receive the proceeds of the waqf of Shaykh al-Asad at least through the 1980s. In 2003, the municipality of Deir al-Asad merged with Majd al-Krum and Bi'ina to form the city of Shaghur. However, it was reinstated in 2008 after Shaghur was dissolved.

Historic buildings

Crusader abbey and church remains
The large remains of a Crusader church and abbey was already noted by Guérin and the "Survey of Western Palestine". Guérin noted after his 1875 visit that: "Constructed of small stones very regularly cut, this church had three naves and three apses. Its windows were narrow, and fashioned like actual loopholes, and several details of its architecture show a knowledge of art. Unfortunately, the Druses have half demolished it, and what they have spared has been converted into a stable." Denys Pringle named it "The abbey Church of St. George," and dated it do the 12th century.

Mosque and tomb of Shaykh al-Asad al-Safadi
The smaller chamber, to the north, holds the tomb of Shyakh al-Asad, while the southern, larger chamber holds a prayer hall. To the east there is a courtyard.

Notable people

 Ahmed Dabbah
 Mahmoud Darwish

References

Bibliography

 
 (pp. 167 - 169 )

 

 
 (p. 165 )

External links
Welcome To Dayr al-Asad
Survey of Western Palestine, Map 3:  IAA, Wikimedia commons 

16th-century establishments in Ottoman Syria
Arab localities in Israel
Local councils in Northern District (Israel)